The Republican Party is a centrist political party in Belarus. It supports the government of president Alexander Lukashenko.

In 2009 Ministry of Justice of the Republic of Belarus issued a written warning due to the fact that the party did not provide information to the Ministry about their activities.

In 2017, an opinion poll was published that said that 0.7% of Belorussians support RP, and thus as many as BPF Party.

References

1994 establishments in Belarus
Political parties established in 1994
Political parties in Belarus